Davier Walcott (born January 2, 1990) is a footballer playing with North Mississauga SC. Born in Canada, he represented the Grenada national team.

Playing career 
Walcott began playing at the college level with the Humber College in 2012. In 2012, he played in the Canadian Soccer League with North York Astros. In 2013, he played abroad in the IV Liga with Orlicz Suchedniów. He played with Woodbridge Strikers in League1 Ontario in 2014, but later played abroad in the Verbandsliga Hessen-Süd with 1. FCA Darmstadt. 

In 2021, he played in League1 Ontario with North Mississauga SC.

International career 
Walcott made his debut for the Grenada national football team on March 19, 2016 in a friendly match against Trinidad and Tobago. He also participation in several matches during the 2017 Caribbean Cup qualification.

References 

1990 births
Living people
Association football midfielders
Canadian Soccer League (1998–present) players
Grenada international footballers
Grenadian footballers
Grenadian expatriate footballers
Grenadian expatriate sportspeople in Germany
Grenadian expatriate sportspeople in Poland
North York Astros players
Soccer players from Toronto
Woodbridge Strikers players
North Mississauga SC players
Canadian people of Grenadian descent